How to Draw Comics the Marvel Way is a book by Stan Lee and John Buscema. The book teaches the aspiring comic book artist how to draw and create comic books. The examples are from Marvel Comics and Buscema artwork.  It was first published in 1978 by Marvel Fireside Books and has been reprinted regularly. The book created a generation of cartoonists who learned there was a "Marvel way to draw and a wrong way to draw". It is considered "one of the best instruction books on creating comics ever produced."

Scott McCloud has cited the book as a good reference for teaching the process of making comic books.

Lee and Buscema also created a video version of the book which is now on DVD.

See also 
 Marvel Premiere Classics
 The Official Marvel Try-Out Book
Stan Lee

References

External links
 Tribute page to the Marvel Fireside Books series
 Book Review

Books about visual art
Marvel Comics titles
Books about comics
Handbooks and manuals
Works by Stan Lee